Nicholas and Alexandra is a 1971 British epic historical drama film directed by Franklin J. Schaffner, from a screenplay by James Goldman and Edward Bond based on Robert K. Massie's 1967 book of the same name. It tells the story of the last ruling Russian monarch, Tsar Nicholas II of Russia (Michael Jayston), and his wife, Tsarina Alexandra (Janet Suzman), from 1904 until their deaths in 1918. The ensemble cast includes Tom Baker as Grigori Rasputin, Laurence Olivier as Sergei Witte, Brian Cox as Leon Trotsky, Ian Holm as Vasily Yakovlev, and Vivian Pickles as Nadezhda Krupskaya.

The film was theatrically released on 13 December 1971 by Columbia Pictures to mixed reviews and commercial failure, grossing $7 million on a $9 million budget. Regardless, the film received six nominations at the 44th Academy Awards, including for Best Picture and Best Actress (Suzman), and won two: Best Art Direction and Best Costume Design.

Plot
In 1904, Tsarina Alexandra Feodorovna, wife of Tsar Nicholas II of Russia, gives birth to their fifth child and first son, Alexei. Despite pleas from Grand Duke Nicholas and prime minister Count Sergei Witte, Nicholas refuses to end the Russo-Japanese War or accept demands for a constitutional monarchy, believing that doing either will make him look weak. The following year, Alexandra meets Grigori Rasputin, a Siberian peasant posing as a holy man, at a gala celebrating the birthday of Dowager Empress Marie Feodorovna; she soon turns to Rasputin for spiritual guidance after court physician Eugene Botkin diagnoses Alexei with haemophilia.

In response to increasing public unrest, Orthodox priest Father Georgy Gapon leads a procession of workers to the Winter Palace, hoping to present Nicholas with a petition calling for political representation. Armed soldiers open fire on the crowd as they approach, killing hundreds. The events of Bloody Sunday, coupled with the humiliating defeat in the Russo-Japanese War, prompt Nicholas to create the Duma.

Eight years later, Nicholas meets with Prime Minister Pyotr Stolypin while holidaying at the Livadia Palace with his family. Stolypin presents Nicholas with police reports about Rasputin's dissolute behavior, which is damaging the Tsar's reputation; Nicholas dismisses Rasputin from the court. Alexandra demands his return, as she believes only Rasputin can stop Alexei's bleeding attacks, but Nicholas stands firm.

The 1913 Romanov Tercentenary celebrations occur and a lavish Royal Tour across Imperial Russia ensues, but crowds are thin. Other national festivities and Church celebrations go ahead, but at an event at the Kiev Opera House, Stolypin is assassinated. Nicholas responds by executing the assassins, permitting the police to terrorize the peasants, and dissolving the Duma.

Alexei falls at the Spała Hunting Lodge, which leads to a bleeding attack so severe that it is presumed he will die. The Tsarina writes to Rasputin, who responds with words of comfort. Alexei recovers and Rasputin returns.

When World War I begins, Nicholas, refusing to heed his advisors and believing his familial connections with the royal houses of Europe will protect him, orders a full mobilization of the Imperial Russian Army on the German border. Germany responds by declaring war and activating a series of its alliances that escalates the war. A year later, with the war going badly for Russia on the Eastern Front, Alexandra persuades Nicholas to take personal command of the troops; he leaves for the front, taking over from the experienced but weary Grand Duke Nicholas.

Alexandra is left with significant power in St. Petersburg and, under Rasputin's influence, makes a series of poor decisions that further damage the country. Nicholas is visited by his mother Dowager Empress Feodorovna, who scolds him for neglecting domestic issues and implores him to eliminate Rasputin and send Alexandra to Livadia. Concerned about Rasputin's influence, Grand Duke Dmitri and Prince Felix Yusupov assassinate him at a party in 1916; distraught, Alexandra refuses to govern and orders Dmitri's assassination, but is coldly rebuffed.

Even with Rasputin dead, Alexandra continues her misrule. The army is ill-supplied, starving, and openly defiant, and freezing workers revolt in St. Petersburg in March 1917. Nicholas decides to return to Tsarskoye Selo too late and is forced to abdicate on his train.

The family, with Dr. Botkin and attendants, leave Tsarskoye Selo and are exiled by Alexander Kerensky to Tobolsk in Siberia in August 1917 after none of Russia's allies, to whom he appealed for political asylum, including Nicholas' cousin George V of the United Kingdom, will grant them sanctuary because of Nicholas' abuses of power. They live in a spartan house in the tundra with decent guards. In October 1917, Russia falls to the Bolsheviks, who intend to take the royal family to Moscow to stand trial. However, when Moscow is captured by the White Army during the Russian Civil War, the royals are diverted to Ipatiev House in Yekaterinburg. Under harsher conditions, they are guarded by the cold-blooded Yakov Yurovsky and his anti-royalist troops.

The family receives a batch of withheld letters from friends and relatives and laugh together as they read through them. In the early hours of 17 July 1918, the Bolsheviks awaken the family and Dr. Botkin, telling them they must be transferred again. As they are waiting in the cellar, Yurovsky and his assistants enter the room and open fire.

Cast
Credits adapted from the American Film Institute.
The Imperial Family
 Michael Jayston as Nicholas II, the Tsar
 Janet Suzman as Alexandra, his wife, the Tsarina
 Roderic Noble as Alexei, their son, the Tsesarevich
 Ania Marson as Olga, the eldest child
 Lynne Frederick as Tatiana, the second child
 Candace Glendenning as Marie, the third child.
 Fiona Fullerton as Anastasia, the youngest daughter.
 Harry Andrews as Nikolasha, Nicholas's cousin
 Irene Worth as Marie Fedorovna, The Queen Mother
The Imperial Household
 Tom Baker as Grigori Rasputin
 Jack Hawkins as Vladimir, the Minister of the Imperial Court
 Timothy West as Dr. Botkin, the court physician
 Jean-Claude Drouot as Gilliard, the children's Swiss tutor
 John Hallam as Nagorny, a young sailor who is Alexis's faithful personal bodyguard
 Guy Rolfe as Dr. Fedorov, the Imperial Court Surgeon
 John Wood as Col. Kobylinsky, the Romanovs' captor
 Katharine Schofield as Alexandra Tegleva, the nursemaid
The Statesmen
 Laurence Olivier as Count Witte, the Prime Minister
 Michael Redgrave as Sazonov, the Foreign Minister
 Eric Porter as Stolypin, the Prime Minister after Witte
 Maurice Denham as Kokovtsov, the Prime Minister after Stolypin
 John McEnery as Kerensky, leader of the Russian Provisional Government
 Gordon Gostelow as Guchkov, War Minister of the Russian Provisional Government
 Ralph Truman as Rodzianko, chairman of the Duma
The Revolutionaries
 Michael Bryant as Lenin, leader of the Bolsheviks
 Vivian Pickles as Krupskaya, Lenin's wife
 Brian Cox as Trotsky
 James Hazeldine as Stalin
 Ian Holm as Yakovlev
 Alan Webb as Yurovsky
 Stephen Greif as Martov
 Steven Berkoff as Pankratov (ru)
 Leon Lissek as Avadeyev
 David Giles as Goloshchyokin
Other characters
 Roy Dotrice as General Alexeiev
 Richard Warwick as Grand Duke Dmitry, the Tsar's cousin
 Martin Potter as Prince Yusupov, one of Rasputin's assassins
 Vernon Dobtcheff as Dr. Stanislaus de Lazovert, one of Rasputin's assassins
 Curt Jürgens as Georg Sklarz, the German Consul to Switzerland
 Julian Glover as Georgy Gapon, priest and protest leader
 Alexander Knox as Elihu Root, the American Ambassador
 Ralph Neville as George Buchanan, the British Ambassador
 George Rigaud as Maurice Paléologue, the French Ambassador
 John Shrapnel as Petya, a Bolshevik proletarian
 Diana Quick as Sonya, Petya's wife
 John Forbes-Robertson as Colonel Voikov

Production

Development 
Producer Spiegel tackled Nicholas and Alexandra when he was shut out from working with director David Lean on Doctor Zhivago, which was also set against the backdrop of revolutionary Russia. Spiegel had alienated Lean when the two worked together on the film Lawrence of Arabia, pressing the perfectionist director in order to get the movie finished on time. Spiegel initially tried to make Nicholas and Alexandra without buying the rights to the book by Robert K. Massie, claiming that the historical account was in public domain but, eventually, Spiegel purchased the rights and hired writer James Goldman to adapt Massie's book as a screenplay.

Goldman, who had written the popular play and film The Lion in Winter, labored on draft after draft as directors came and went (George Stevens, Anthony Harvey, Joseph Mankiewicz, Charles Jarrot, Jack Gold, Ken Russell, Lindsay Anderson, and John Boorman were all attached to the project at one point). After seeing Patton, Goldman recommended Franklin J. Schaffner.

Filming 
Spiegel turned to former collaborators John Box for production design, and cinematographer Freddie Young (Lawrence of Arabia) to give the production the epic touch he felt it needed. Principal photography took place in Spain and Yugoslavia.

Spiegel had to work with stricter budget constraints from Columbia Studios than before. He had wanted Peter O'Toole as Rasputin and Vanessa Redgrave as Alexandra but was constrained. Notable actors such as Laurence Olivier, Irene Worth, Michael Redgrave and Jack Hawkins appeared in the film, but actor Rex Harrison turned down a supporting role as too small.

Tom Baker, a member of the Royal National Theatre, was recommended for the role of Rasputin by Laurence Olivier, then the director of the company.

Reception
Despite the detailed production design, photography, and strong performances from the cast, Nicholas and Alexandra failed to find the large audience it needed to be a financial success. However, it was chosen by the American National Board of Review as one of the Top 10 Films of 1971.

The review aggregator website Rotten Tomatoes reported that 67% of critics have given the film a positive review based on 15 reviews, with an average rating of 6.20/10. On Metacritic, the film has an average score of 57 out of 100 based on 10 reviews, indicating "mixed or average reviews". Roger Ebert of the Chicago Sun Times gave it two-and-a-half stars out of four, writing "If the movie isn't exactly stirring, however, it is undeniably interesting, especially after the intermission."

Halliwell's Film and Video Guide described Nicholas and Alexandra as an "inflated epic of occasional interest, mainly for its sets" and "generally heavy going", awarding it one star from a possible four. In 2013, Alex von Tunzelmann wrote for The Guardian, "Nicholas and Alexandra boasts terrific performances and gorgeous production design, but it's bloated and unwieldy. There is more history here than the film-makers know what to do with." For Radio Times, Tom Hutchinson awarded the film three stars out of five, describing it as a "sumptuous, if overlong, epic" which "shows the stretchmarks of too much padding" and "overwhelms us with its detail, though Tom Baker is a lot of fun as the leering mystic Rasputin". Stanley Kauffmann of The New Republic described the film as 'flabby'.

Historical accuracy
There is at least one anachronism; Peter Stolypin had been assassinated in 1911, two years before the Romanov dynasty tercentenary in which he is portrayed as being alive before being assassinated.

Awards and nominations

Home media
Nicholas and Alexandra received a home video release on VHS in 1987 by RCA/Columbia Pictures Home Video and reissued in the 1990s by Columbia Tristar Home Video.

Its DVD release was on 27 July 1999 from Sony Pictures Home Entertainment. The DVD featured a vintage 14-minute featurette on the production of the film and six more minutes of scenes and dialogue not found on previous VHS tapes.

The film received a Blu-ray release in February 2013 from Twilight Time. The Blu-ray featured three featurettes on the production of the film covering the makeup, costume designs and actresses playing the Tsar's daughters in the film. It also contained the original theatrical trailer as well as an isolated music score. The latter was presented in stereo even though the sound on the Blu-ray was presented in mono. The Blu-ray release was limited to only 3,000 copies. This film is also available for sale or rent as a video online download through both Amazon and Apple's iTunes Store, with Amazon's online file containing the six more minutes of scenes and dialogue that Apple's iTunes file doesn't.

Soundtrack
This soundtrack was written by Richard Rodney Bennett.

References

External links

 
 
 
 
 

1971 films
1970s biographical drama films
1970s historical drama films
British biographical drama films
British epic films
British historical drama films
Biographical films about Russian royalty
Cultural depictions of Nicholas II of Russia
Cultural depictions of Grand Duchess Anastasia Nikolaevna of Russia
Films about Grigori Rasputin
Cultural depictions of Vladimir Lenin
Cultural depictions of Joseph Stalin
Films about capital punishment
Films directed by Franklin J. Schaffner
Films produced by Sam Spiegel
Films scored by Richard Rodney Bennett
Films set in Poland
Films set in the 1900s
Films set in the 1910s
Cultural depictions of Leon Trotsky
Films that won the Best Costume Design Academy Award
Films whose art director won the Best Art Direction Academy Award
Russian Revolution films
British World War I films
Horizon Pictures films
Columbia Pictures films
Films shot in Spain
Films based on works by American writers
Films based on non-fiction books
Films with screenplays by James Goldman
1971 drama films
Films shot in Yugoslavia
Films set in 1904
Films set in 1905
Films set in 1913
Films set in 1914
Films set in 1916
Films set in 1917
Films set in 1918
Films set in Saint Petersburg
Films about the Russian Empire
Films set in Siberia
1970s English-language films
1970s British films